Sumner John Chadbourne (July 28, 1830 – October 1, 1902) was an American politician in the state of Maine. He served as Secretary of State of Maine from 1876 to 1878, and in 1880. He also served in the Maine House of Representatives.

References

1830 births
1902 deaths
Members of the Maine House of Representatives
Secretaries of State of Maine
People from Dixmont, Maine
Maine Democrats
Maine Republicans
19th-century American politicians